"(Always Be My) Sunshine" is a hip hop song by American rapper Jay-Z with guest vocals from fellow femcee Foxy Brown and R&B singer-songwriter Babyface who performs the song's chorus. It serves as the first single from his second album In My Lifetime, Vol. 1 (1997). The track features production by Daven "Prestige" Vanderpool. Vanderpool samples MC Lyte's "Cha Cha Cha", Alexander O'Neal's "Sunshine", Kraftwerk's "The Man-Machine" and The Fearless Four's "Rockin' It" for the track's beat. In addition, George Fonenette plays keyboards on this song. The song's lyrics helped indicate Jay-Z's change from his Mafioso rap style to a more commercial "shiny suit" style. Steve Juon of RapReviews.com supports the song claiming that it is a less gangsta version of The Notorious B.I.G.'s "Me & My Bitch", a well-received track. Jay-Z cites this song as "what killed the album."

Music video
The music video was directed by Hype Williams. Jay-Z is featured in the video rapping in a room resembling a Rubik's Cube & having a carnival theme to it with Foxy Brown rapping alongside of him. Jay-Z & co-founder of Roc-A-Fella, Damon Dash later regretted doing the video citing that the video wasn't their style.

Formats and track listings

CD
 "Sunshine (Radio Edit)" (3:15)
 "Sunshine (Album Version)" (4:11)
 "Sunshine (Clean Version)" (4:12)
 "Sunshine (TV track)" (4:12) 
 "Sunshine (Acappella)" (3:49)

Vinyl

A-side
 "Sunshine (Album Version)"
 "Sunshine (TV Track)" 
 "Sunshine (Radio Edit)"

B-side
 "Sunshine (Clean Version)"
 "Sunshine (Instrumental)"
 "Sunshine (Acappella)"

Charts

See also
List of songs recorded by Jay-Z

References

1997 singles
Jay-Z songs
Babyface (musician) songs
Foxy Brown (rapper) songs
Songs written by Jay-Z
Songs written by Jimmy Jam and Terry Lewis
Roc-A-Fella Records singles
Music videos directed by Hype Williams
1997 songs